Jorge Luis Aguilar is an Anglican Bishop: since 2017 he has been the Bishop of Peru.

References

Anglican bishops of Peru
Living people
21st-century Anglican bishops in South America
Year of birth missing (living people)